Dr. Gaur Hari Singhania Institute of Management and Research (GHS-IMR), Kanpur, is a private Business School in India. It was established in 1995 by J. K. Organisation. GHS-IMR offers two-year full-time Post Graduate Diploma in Management (PGDM) which is approved by All India Council for Technical Education and National Assessment and Accreditation Council (NAAC).
GHS-IMR aims at developing technical, professional, and managerial excellence, along with social and cultural sensitivity in students. Besides emphasizing the importance of management ethics, the institute also has concern for the environment and stresses upon students to become 'environment-friendly' for ensuring the overall sustainable development of the society.

Parent Organization
J. K. Organisation

Affiliations and Accreditation 
All India Council for Technical Education
National Assessment and Accreditation Council (NAAC)

Award & Rankings
"14th Best B-Schools of North India 2021 by Silicon India,
"3rd Best B-School in Uttar Pradesh 2021" Silicon India,
"47th Best B-School" of India by Business India
"Excellence in Education Award" by Governor of UP, Hosted by Times Group

Campus

The campus is about 4  km. from Kanpur Central Railway Station. GHS-IMR has a campus with buildings, sports ground and trees.

Library
The GHS-IMR library has a collection of over 25,000 books, in addition to electronic resources which include e-books, journals, databases, audio-visual materials, CDs/DVDs, e-journals, reports, case studies, conference proceedings, training manuals etc.

Academics
The institute offers one programme Post Graduate Diploma in Management (PGDM). This programme if approved by All India Council for Technical Education, Ministry of HRD, and Accridited by National Assessment and Accreditation Council (NAAC). 
The PGDM program of GHS-IMR follows the trimester system as followed by IIMs. In the trimester system, the examinations are held 3 times in a year. Thus a 2-Year PGDM Programme has 6 trimesters which are also called terms. Each term has 6-7 courses, with every course being 30 hrs duration. The term runs for 10–11 weeks and at the end of every term, examinations are held. On the face, the system seems to be difficult but by being regular in class the students very easily sail through every trimester and finally complete the PGDM.

Admissions 
GHS-IMR has a three-step admission procedure. The top percentiles in CAT/MAT/XAT/GMAT/AIMS Test for Management Admissions (ATMA) are called in for a group discussion/activity in major cities. Potential enrollees are evaluated on their profiles. The discussion/activity is followed by a personal interview with two faculty members. The students having the maximum combined score are then given a final call. Rights of admission are reserved to the administration.

International Collaborations
Institute offers one of the largest students exchange programs in the country & the institute has collaborations with universities from the USA, Russia, China, UAE & Nepal.

Synergy University Russia
University of Science and Technology of China China
University of Nebraska Omaha United States
Novel Academy Nepal
Westford Education Group, UAE UAE

References

External links
 

Business schools in Uttar Pradesh
Universities and colleges in Kanpur
All India Council for Technical Education
Educational institutions established in 1995
1995 establishments in Uttar Pradesh
Management education